Karin Oberleitner (born 14 March 1968) is an Austrian former professional tennis player.

Oberleitner represented Austria in a 1985 Federation Cup tie against the USSR in Nagoya, where she featured in a dead rubber doubles match with Barbara Pollet, losing to Svetlana Cherneva and Larisa Savchenko. She competed on the international circuit through the late 1980s and reached a career best singles ranking of 290 in the world.

Her husband is former ATP Tour player Alex Antonitsch and their daughter Mira has played Fed Cup for Austria. The couple also have a son Sam who is a professional ice hockey player.

ITF finals

Singles: 2 (0–2)

Doubles: 2 (1–1)

See also
List of Austria Fed Cup team representatives

References

External links
 
 
 

1968 births
Living people
Austrian female tennis players